A by-election was held for the New South Wales Legislative Assembly electorate of Bourke on 21 January 1887 because of the resignation of both the sitting members, Russell Barton, and William Sawers. The writ however was not returned as Parliament was dissolved on 26 January 1887.

Dates

Result

Both the sitting members, Russell Barton and William Sawers, resigned. The writ was not returned as the Parliament was dissolved on 26 January.

Aftermath
The same 3 candidates contested the election on 22 February. Waddell still headed the poll however Wilson was able to gather enough votes to take the second seat over Willis.

See also
 Electoral results for the district of Bourke
 List of New South Wales state by-elections

Notes

References

1887 elections in Australia
New South Wales state by-elections
1890s in New South Wales